This was the first edition of the tournament.

Saketh Myneni and Sanam Singh won the title, defeating Sanchai Ratiwatana and Sonchat Ratiwatana in the final, 6–3, 6–2.

Seeds

Draw

References
 Main Draw

KPIT MSLTA Challenger - Doubles